Rehobeth is a town in Houston County, Alabama, United States. Rehobeth, originally named Sanders, began as a crossroads community in the 1890s; however, it was not until 1996, that the town was incorporated. Rehobeth is part of the Dothan Metropolitan Statistical Area. At the time of the 2010 census, the population was 1,297, up from 993 at the 2000 census.

Geography
Rehobeth is located in western Houston County at the geographic coordinates of   (31.12296, -85.45271 decimal degrees). It is bordered to the north by the city of Dothan and to the northwest by the town of Taylor.

Demographics

2010 census
As of the 2010 census, there were 1,297 people in 485 households, including 388 families, in the town. The racial makeup of the town was 95.9% White, 1.5% Black or African American, 0.8% American Indian and Alaska Native, 0.2% Asian, 0.8% some other race, and 0.9% two or more races. Two-and-a-half percent of the population were Hispanic or Latino of any race.

Of the 485 households 35.5% had children under the age of 18 living with them, 66.0% were married couples living together, 8.7% had a female householder with no husband present, and 20.0% were non-families. 17.7% of households were one person and 7.6% were one person aged 65 or older. The average household size was 2.67 and the average family size was 3.02.

The age distribution was 26.2% under the age of 18, 7.6% from 18 to 24, 26.9% from 25 to 44, 27.2% from 45 to 64, and 12.1% 65 or older. The median age was 37.3 years. For every 100 females, there were 93.0 males. For every 100 females age 18 and over, there were 98.5 males.

The median household income was $51,328 and the median family income was $55,156. Males had a median income of $37,647 versus $31,898 for females. The per capita income for the town was $20,195. About 7.3% of families and 9.4% of the population were below the poverty line, including 11.2% of those under age 18 and 20.0% of those age 65 or over.

2000 census
As enumerated in the census of 2000, there were 993 people in 375 households, including 292 families, in the town. The racial makeup of the town was 96.68% White, 0.81% Black or African American, 0.40% American Indian and Alaska Native, 0.10% Asian, 0.40% some other race, and 1.61% two or more races. 1.51% of the population were Hispanic or Latino of any race.

Of the 375 households 38.9% had children under the age of 18 living with them, 61.3% were married couples living together, 12.0% had a female householder with no husband present, and 22.1% were non-families. 20.3% of households were one person and 8.5% were one person aged 65 or older. The average household size was 2.65 and the average family size was 3.04.

The age distribution was 27.5% under the age of 18, 8.9% from 18 to 24, 30.0% from 25 to 44, 21.9% from 45 to 64, and 11.8% 65 or older. The median age was 37 years. For every 100 females, there were 96.6 males. For every 100 females age 18 and over, there were 91.0 males.

The median household income was $34,267 and the median family income was $39,625. Males had a median income of $31,513 versus $21,518 for females. The per capita income for the town was $17,149. About 12.6% of families and 14.2% of the population were below the poverty line, including 20.5% of those under age 18 and 13.9% of those age 65 or over.

2020 census

As of the 2020 United States census, there were 1,791 people, 611 households, and 486 families residing in the town.

References

External links
 
 
 
 
 
 Houston County, Alabama official website
 Dothan Area Chamber of Commerce

Towns in Houston County, Alabama
Towns in Alabama
Dothan metropolitan area, Alabama